Rockefellows Mills (also spelled Rockafellows Mills) is an unincorporated community located within Raritan Township in Hunterdon County, New Jersey, United States. The settlement is located along the South Branch Raritan River near Three Bridges. The river is spanned in the area by the historic Rockafellows Mill Bridge built in 1900 and part of the Raritan–Readington South Branch Historic District. Most of the area within the Raritan Township side of the river is forested however on the north side of the river in Readington Township, some farmland dots the area.

Gallery

References

Raritan Township, New Jersey
Unincorporated communities in Hunterdon County, New Jersey
Unincorporated communities in New Jersey